1105 Fragaria  is an Eos asteroid from the outer regions of the asteroid belt. It was discovered on 1 January 1929, by German astronomer Karl Reinmuth at the Heidelberg Observatory in southwest Germany, and assigned the provisional designation . It was named after the flowering plant Fragaria (strawberry).

Orbit and classification 

Fragaria belongs to the Eos family, the largest asteroid family of the outer asteroid belt consisting of nearly 10,000 members. It orbits the Sun in the outer asteroid belt at a distance of 2.7–3.3 AU once every 5 years and 3 months (1,908 days; semi-major axis of 3.01 AU). Its orbit has an eccentricity of 0.11 and an inclination of 11° with respect to the ecliptic.

The body's observation arc begins at Heidelberg in December 1928, three weeks prior to its official discovery observation.

Naming 

This minor planet was named after Fragaria, the genus of flowering plants in the rose family, commonly known as strawberries. The official naming citation was mentioned in The Names of the Minor Planets by Paul Herget in 1955.

Reinmuth's flower 

Karl Reinmuth submitted a list of 66 newly named asteroids in the early 1930s. This list also contained a sequence of 28 asteroids, starting with 1054 Forsytia, that were all named after plants, in particular flowering plants (also see list of minor planets named after animals and plants).

Physical characteristics 

In the Tholen classification, Fragaria has an ambiguous spectral type, closest to an S-type and somewhat similar to the darker and uncommon T-type asteroids (ST), while polarimetric observations characterized it as an U/L-type asteroid. The overall spectral type for members of the Eos family is that of a K-type.

Rotation period 

In December 2017. a rotational lightcurve of Fragaria was obtained from photometric observations by American photometrist Tom Polakis at the Command Module Observatory  in Arizona. Lightcurve analysis gave a rotation period of  hours with a brightness variation of  magnitude. Since the 1990s, the best period determinations was mady by French and Italian astronomers at ESO's La Silla Observatory using the ESO 1-metre telescope which gave 10.88 hours (or twice the period solution) and an amplitude of 0.12 magnitude. As of 2018, no secure period has been obtained.

Diameter and albedo 

According to the surveys carried out by the Infrared Astronomical Satellite IRAS, the Japanese Akari satellite and the NEOWISE mission of NASA's Wide-field Infrared Survey Explorer, Fragaria measures between 27.92 and 38.41 kilometers in diameter and its surface has an albedo between 0.1017 and 0.166. The Collaborative Asteroid Lightcurve Link derives an albedo of 0.1086 and a diameter of 36.95 kilometers based on an absolute magnitude of 10.19.

References

External links 
 Lightcurve Database Query (LCDB), at www.minorplanet.info
 Dictionary of Minor Planet Names, Google books
 Asteroids and comets rotation curves, CdR – Geneva Observatory, Raoul Behrend
 Discovery Circumstances: Numbered Minor Planets (1)-(5000) – Minor Planet Center
 
 

001105
Discoveries by Karl Wilhelm Reinmuth
Named minor planets
001105
19290101